Shanif Hiran Mansoor (born 5 May 1967) is a Tanzanian CCM politician and Member of Parliament for Kwimba constituency since 2010.

References

1967 births
Living people
Chama Cha Mapinduzi MPs
Tanzanian MPs 2010–2015
Lake Secondary School alumni
Tanzanian politicians of Indian descent